Boyden Carpenter (1909–1995) was a hillbilly and bluegrass artist active in the 1930s and 1940s in the United States.<ref name="DS">{{cite book|author=Dick Spottswood|title=Banjo on the Mountain: Wade Mainer's First Hundred Years|year=2010|publisher=American Made Music Series, University Press of Mississippi|location=Jackson, Mississippi|pages=7, 54, 55|isbn=9781604735918|url=https://books.google.com/books?id=gJOB905mzdQC&dq=hillbilly+kid+boyden&pg=PA131}}</ref>

Personal
Carpenter was born February 26, 1909, in Fries, Grayson County, Virginia, and was raised in Pipers Gap, Carroll County, Virginia and Sparta and Cherry Lane in Alleghany County, North Carolina. 
He died May 25, 1995, at Cherryville, Gaston County, North Carolina. Carpenter was his adopted surname—he was born to John W. and Mary E. Summit but was using his stepfather's surname by 1930.

Musical career
In 1930, Carpenter was working in Winston-Salem, Forsyth County, North Carolina, as a musician in an orchestra. Billing himself as "The Hill Billy Kid," he began playing with several bands, including Wade Mainer's Sons of The Mountaineers, Bill Monroe's Monroe Brothers, and the Crazy Water Crystals-sponsored "Crazy Water Barn Dance" show band in Charlotte, North Carolina.

He had his greatest musical success in the mid-1930s working at WPTF radio station in Raleigh, North Carolina, touring with the "Grandfather of Bluegrass, Wade Mainer and his Sons of the Mountaineers band and Bill Monroe's Monroe Brothers, and playing with Ernest Thompson.

The William Leonard Eury Appalachian Collection at Appalachian State University in Boone, North Carolina, preserves a photograph of Carpenter with his guitar and "The 'Hill Billy' from Alleghany County" guitar case found in a book titled Boyden Carpenter: The Old Gospel Singer.  A 1930s booklet entitled Boyden Carpenter: The Original "Hillbilly Kid"'', which relates his life story and lyrics to his songs, also survives.

References

1909 births
1995 deaths
People from Grayson County, Virginia
People from Carroll County, Virginia
People from Alleghany County, North Carolina
American country guitarists
American male guitarists
American country singer-songwriters
Singer-songwriters from Virginia
Singer-songwriters from North Carolina
Old-time musicians
American bluegrass musicians
20th-century American singers
20th-century American guitarists
Guitarists from Virginia
Guitarists from North Carolina
Country musicians from North Carolina
20th-century American male musicians
American male singer-songwriters